Jipang may refer to:
 Jipang, one of the names of Japan
 , a village in Cepu district, Blora regency, Indonesia
 Jipang (food), traditional Indonesian-Chinese snack